Cumbre del Laudo is a mountain in the Andes Mountains of Argentina.

See also
List of mountains in the Andes

Mountains of Argentina
Six-thousanders of the Andes